Hilbert Van Dijk (24 September 1918 – 10 November 2001) was a Dutch-born Australian fencer. He was the son of Hilbert “Arie” Van Dijk (1908–1944) of Amsterdam. He captained the team épée at the 1956 Summer Olympics.

Six-foot tall, and left-handed, Van Dijk was rated as among the six best epee fencers in Holland. Within a few weeks of his arrival in Australia, he joined the
Swords Club and won the New South Wales foils and epee championships. On the foundation of the Australian Fencing Association in 1949, he entered the first championships and won the first national titles in foils and epee. He won that title a second time as well as being New South Wales foils champion twice and New South Wales epee champion in five consecutive years from 1049–53. In the 1950s he was a member of the All Nations Fencing Club in Sydney. He became a member of the New South Wales Olympic Council.

In August 1953, Van Dijk married Mahdi Browning of Hunters Hill, New South Wales. A niece of the novelist Daphne du Maurier the wedding took place at St Stephen's Uniting Church, Macquarie Street, Sydney. Mahdi was a direct descendant of the English poet Robert Browning and was the daughter of Mr and Mrs Neil Browning of Hunters Hill.

Following the 1956 games Van Dijk joined Richard James Vandyke in the Real Estate company Vandyke and Vandyke at 32-34 The Boulevarde, Strathfield, New South Wales. He used his business partners spelling of his surname for the company rather than his own. He and his wife Mahdi had two children, Marguerite (1958-1992) and Hil, and lived for many years in Strathfield. His son Hil Van Dijk is an artist and is again based in Sydney.

References

External links
 

1918 births
2001 deaths
Australian male fencers
Olympic fencers of Australia
Fencers at the 1956 Summer Olympics
Australian real estate businesspeople